Louisiana Highway 36 (LA 36) is a state highway in Louisiana that serves St. Tammany Parish.  It spans  and is bannered east/west.

Route description
From the west, LA 36 begins at an intersection with LA 21 in Covington and heads east. It enters a brief overlap with LA 59 in Abita Springs for approximately a quarter of a mile. It absorbs LA 435 and then heads east, terminating at LA 41 in Hickory.

In 2008 the stop signs for the intersections in Abita Springs' center were eliminated as all the intersections were amalgamated into a roundabout, ensuring a smoother flow of traffic as left turns ceased to exist. LA 36 is an undivided two-lane highway for its entire length.

History
The original 1955 route of LA 36 originally went as far west as Hammond, using what is now Business US 190 through Covington, then what is now US 190 between Business 190 and US 51 west to Hammond. It was truncated to LA 21 when US 190 was moved to its current routing between US 51 and Business 190, and when what is now Business 190 became US 190.

Major junctions

References

External links

LADOTD Map of Numbered Highways
Louisiana State Highway Log

Transportation in St. Tammany Parish, Louisiana
0036